Mohd Nizad bin Ayub (born 30 August 1988) is a Malaysian professional footballer who plays for Malaysia M3 League club Kelantan United as a forward.

Nizad started his football career playing for Kelantan youth team before been promoted to the first team in 2007. In 2009, he signed a contract with Felda United.

Club career

Sime Darby
Nizad signed a one-year contract with Sime Darby in 2015. He made 8 appearances and 1 goal for the club.

Perak
Nizad signed with Perak in 2017. He made 10 appearances and 2 goals during his debut season with Perak.

Career statistics

Club

Honours
Kelantan
 Malaysia Cup : Runners-up 2009
 Malaysia FA Cup : Runners-up  2009, 2011

Perak
 Malaysia Cup : 2018

Kelantan United
 Malaysia M3 League : 2019

References

External links
 
 Mohd Nizad Ayub at SoccerPunter

1988 births
Living people
Malaysian footballers
People from Kelantan
Kelantan FA players
PKNS F.C. players
Terengganu F.C. II players
Felda United F.C. players
Sime Darby F.C. players
Malaysia Super League players
Association football forwards
Malaysian people of Malay descent